Nikoleta Tsagari (born ) was a Greek group rhythmic gymnast. She represented her nation at international competitions. 

She participated at the 2008 Summer Olympics in Beijing. She also competed at world championships, including at the 2007  World Rhythmic Gymnastics Championships.

References

External links

https://database.fig-gymnastics.com/public/gymnasts/biography/4676/true?backUrl=%2Fpublic%2Fresults%2Fdisplay%2F544%3FidAgeCategory%3D8%26idCategory%3D78%23anchor_41833
http://a.longinestiming.com/File/Download?id=000005030002000000FFFFFFFFFFFF02

1990 births
Living people
Greek rhythmic gymnasts
Place of birth missing (living people)
Gymnasts at the 2008 Summer Olympics
Olympic gymnasts of Greece